St. Joseph's Institutions is a conglomerate of educational institutions in the city of Bangalore, India. The institution was founded in the year 1882 by the Fathers of the French Foreign Mission. In 1937, the college was handed over to the Society of Jesus, a Catholic religious order dedicated to the education of young people. These schools and colleges are governed by the Bangalore Jesuit Educational Society, which is a part of the greater Society of Jesuits.

Schools
 St. Joseph's Boy's High School
 St. Joseph's Indian High School

Colleges
 St. Joseph's Pre-university College
 St. Joseph's College of Arts and Science
 St. Joseph's College of Commerce
 St Joseph's College of Law
St Joseph's Institute of Management

Sister Institutions

 St. Aloysius College, Mangalore

See also
 List of Jesuit sites

References

External links
 http://www.sjbhsbangalore.in/
 http://www.sjpu.com/newsite/index.htm
 http://www.sjc.ac.in/index.html
 http://www.sjcc.edu.in/
 http://www.sjcba.edu.in/

Educational institutions established in 1882
Karnataka education-related lists
1882 establishments in India